The Bedroom Window may refer to:

 The Bedroom Window (1924 film), a 1924 film by William C. deMille
 The Bedroom Window (1987 film), a 1987 film by Curtis Hanson